Sugarloaf Mountain is in Riverside County, California, United States, near milepost 82 on Pines to Palms Scenic Byway (SR 74). This mountain was officially named by the USGS and appears on their topographic maps.

References

External links
 

Mountains of Riverside County, California
Mountains of Southern California